Georg "Schorsch" Nickaes (born 12 June 1971) is a German ski mountaineer and speaker of the German ski mountaineering team.

Nickaes was born in Bad Reichenhall. He enjoys also mountain running and ice climbing, and finished the army mountain guide training in 1994. He started in international ski mountaineering races after 1999. He was buried with two companions by a snow slab during a three-day ski mountaineering a few years ago, but they freed themselves. Nickaes is married with one child.

Selected results 
 1999:
 German record time, "DIAMIR-Race"
 2001:
 German record time, Trofeo Mezzalama (together with Gerhard Reithmeier and Matthias Robl)
 2nd, Mountain Attack race
 2002:
 3rd, "International Open", Saalbach
 2004: 
 3rd, German Championship single
 7th, Mountain Attack race
 2005:
 5th, German Championship single
 3rd, European Championship relay race (together with Franz Graßl, Stefan Klinger and Toni Steurer)
 2006:
 5th, World Championship relay race (together with Toni Steurer, Franz Graßl and Martin Echtler)

Patrouille des Glaciers 

 2006: 7th ("seniors II" ranking), together with Wolfgang Palzer and Tim Stachel
 2008: 2nd ("seniors I" ranking), together with Gerhard Reithmeier and Benedikt Böhm

External links 
 Georg Nickaes at skimountaineering.com

References 

1971 births
Living people
German male ski mountaineers
German Army personnel
People from Bad Reichenhall
Sportspeople from Upper Bavaria